Holmegaard is a manor house and estate situated close to Fensmark, Næstved Municipality, some 60 km south of Copenhagen, Denmark. The three-winged, half-timbered main building was constructed for Claus Oludsen Daa in 1635. The estate was acquired by Christian Conrad Danneskiold-Samsøe in 1801 and has remained in the hands of his descendents since then. Holmegaard Glass Factory was established by his widow Henriette Danneskiold-Samsøe in 1825. The main building was listed in the Danish registry of protected buildings and places in 1918. The estate covers  1,724 hectares of land (including Juellinge and Tryggevælde).

History

Early history
The estate wassimply known as Holme in the second half of the 14th century. The first known owner of the estate is Tyge Mortensen Ravensberg. It was later for more than 150 years  owned by members of the Griis family.

Daa family

On the death of Hans Joachimsen Griis, ownership of Holmegaard was divided into two stakes. On Oluf Daa's death, his share of the estate passed to his son Claus Olufsen Daa. He was an influential privy councillor who had participated in both the Kalmar War (1611-1613) and the  Thirty Years' War (1618-1648). In 1631, he was appointed as Admiral of the Realm. In 1625 he managed also to acquire the other stake in the Holmegaard estate. In 1635, he constructed a new three-winged main building.

On Claus Olufsen Daa's death, Holmegaard passed to his son Oluf Clausen Daa. He sold some of the land and later had to leave the country due to his close ties to Corfitz Ulfeldt. On his return to Denmark, Frederick III forced him to part with Holmegaard in exchange for the much less valuable estate Hevringholm. Broksø and 10 other farms were by the crown subsequently placed under Holmegaard.

Krabbe Trolle and Post

In 1670, on his death bed, Frederick III placed his ring on the finger of his page Otto Krabbe and granted him Holmegaard in appreciation of his services. Otto Krabbe was also a favorite of Christian V (1646-1699), who promoted him to chamberlain. In 1671, he was appointed as prefect (amtmand) of Tryggevælde, Vordingborg and Møn. In 1675, Holmegaard and Broksø were both granted the status of manors. This status came with a number of privileges, including freedom from taxes. Krabbe reacquired much of the land that had been sold by Oluf Claussen Daa. With the death of his father-in-law Otto Skeel in  1695. he also became the owner of Egholm and Krabbesholm. Krabbe died in 1719 and was buried in Roskilde Cathedral. His widow Birgitte (née Skeel) managed the four estates for the next 19 years. Their three children had all died in an early age. Birgitte Skeel bequeathed Holmegaard and Broksø to Birgitte Restorff, daughter of one of Krabbe's nieces, who was married to Knud Trolle. Birgitte Restorff, who outlived her husband by 30 years, kept the estates until her death in 1790. Having no children, Birgitte Trolle (née Restorff) bequeathed  her estates to her niece, Margrethe Elisabeth Restorff, who was married to Peder Lasson von Post.

Danneskiold-Samsøe family

In 1801,Christian Conrad, Count of Danneskiold-Samsøe purchased Holmegaard and Broksø. In 1792, when he was still a minor, Danneskiold-Samsøe had joined the Council of Samsøe County and the board of Gisselfeld Abbey. He also bought a number of other estates, including Næsbyholm (1804), Ravnstrup (1805), Bavelse, Aalebæksgaard and Rosendal (1806) and Nordfeld (1820). In 1808 he became prefect of Præstø County; he retained this position until his death.  He initiated various public works, such as a port at Karrebaeksminde and a hospital in Naestved, He lived with his wife Henriette Danneskiold-Samsøe and their six children at Gisselfeld.

He both sold some of the land that had belonged to Holmegaard, but also added new land. In the 1820s, he planned to create a glass factory there as he realized the local peat could be used as fuel. He requested permission from the king to go ahead with his plans in 1823 but died before receiving an answer. His widow persisted, receiving permission from the king to build the factory. Despite having to care for her six children alone, she was able to open the Holmegaard Glasværk in 1825, originally producing green glass bottles but soon moving into fine crystal glass. In 1836, she also established a brickyard on the estate. In 1941, she constructed the farm Petersminde on some of the land.

 
Henriette Danneskiold-Samsøe died in Copenhagen on 28 July 1843. Holmegaard manor and glass factory were passed to her second eldest son Christian Conrad Sophus Danneskiold-Samsøe (1800-1886).  In 1833, he had married Lady Elisabeth Brudenell-Bruce. In 1850, he was second time married to  Anna Lovise Amalie von Zytphe. He expanded Holmegaard Glass Factory and managed it with great skill. In 1960, he succeeded his brother as holder of the County of Samsø. He also constructed the country house Enrum at Vedbæk.

He died without children on 10 January 1908. Holmegaard, Holmegaard Glass Factory and Enrum were therefore passed to his nephew Aage Conrad Danneskiold-Samsøe. He was married to Fanny baronesse Lotzbeck, daughter of vice admiral A.F.M. Evers. Their only child was the daughter Elisabeth Henriette Aagesdatter Danneskiold-Samsøe. On her father's death, she became the owner of Brattingsborg and Holmegaard. On 24 June 1954, she married Frants Aksel Lassen. On her death, Holmegaard passed to their younger son Christian Ivar Danneskiold Lassen. They had three children, two sons and a daughter. On her death, Holmegaard went to their younger son Christian Ivar Danneskiold Lassen.

Architecture
Golmegaard's half-timbered main building stands on an almost quadratic castle bak surrounded by moats. It consists of a 26-bays long, two-storey main wing in the west and two slightly lower side wings in the south and north. The hipped roof is clad in red tile. The gate in the main wing features the coat of arms of the Daa family and the inscription  ”Her Claus Daa til Rafnstrop med sin kære frue Ingeborg Parsberg lod dette hus opsætte, der man skrev efter guds byrd anno 1635”. The two side wings were priginally single-storey, free-standing buildings. The south wing was heightened and attached to the main wing in the late 17th century. A stone tablet with the year "1675" and the coat of arms and initials of Otto Krabbe and his first wife Dorthe Gersdorf seems to date this extension to that year. The north wing is 21 bays long of which the first nine-bays-long section is two storeys tall and the remaining 12 bays are single-storey. The single-storey section was originally used as a smithy but has now been converted into a garage. The south wing was formerly also 21 bays long, but its eastern part collapsed in the late 18th century and was never reconstructed.

Today
Holmegaard is currently owned by Christian Ivar Schou Danneskiold Lassen. He is also the owner of the estates Juellinge and Tryggevælde. The three estates covers a combined area of  1,724 hectares of land.

List of owners
 (1387) Tyge Mortensen Ravensberg
 (1402) Anders Pedersen Griis
 ( - ) Peder Andersen Griis
 ( - ) Joachim Pedersen Griis
 ( - ) Hans Joachimsen Griis
 Stake I
 (1535) Anna Nielsdatter Lange, gift Griis
 ( - ) Gunde Lange
 ( -1571) Frederik Gundesen Lange
 (1571- ) Peder Oxe
 ( - ) Eustachius von Thümen
 ( -1625) Anne Hansdatter Baden, gift von Thümen
 Stake II
( -1532)Oluf Daa
 (1532- ) Claus Olufsen Daa
 ( - ) Oluf Clausen Daa
 ( -1625) Claus Olufsen Daa
 (1625-1641) Claus Olufsen Daa
 (1641-1664) Oluf Clausen Daa
 (1664-1670) The Crown
 (1670-1719) Otto Krabbe
 (1719-1737) Birgitte Skeel, gift Krabbe
 (1737-1760) Knud Trolle
 (1760-1790) Birgitte Restorff, gift Trolle
 (1790-1801) Peter Lasson von Post
 (1801-1823) Christian Conrad Danneskiold-Samsøe
 (1823-1843) Henriette Danneskiold-Samsøe, née Kaas
 (1843-1886) Christian Conrad Sophus Danneskiold-Samsøe
 (1886-1908) Ernest Danneskiold-Samsøe
 (1908-1945) Aage Conrad Danneskiold-Samsøe
 (1945-1980) Elisabeth Henriette Aagesdatter Danneskiold-Samsøe, gift Lassen
 (1980- ) Christian Ivar Schou Danneskiold Lassen

References

External links
 Official website
 Source
 Source

Manor houses in Næstved Municipality
Listed buildings and structures in Næstved Municipality
Listed castles and manor houses in Denmark
Timber framed buildings in Denmark
Houses completed in 1635